Sorolopha dorsichlora is a moth of the family Tortricidae. It is found in Burma and Vietnam.

The wingspan is about 18 mm. The ground colour of the forewings is brownish with brown strigulae (fine streaks) and weak greenish suffusions postmedially in the costal half and green in the dorsal half. The hindwings are brownish.

Etymology
The name refers to the colouration of the forewing dorsum and is derived from Greek chloros (meaning green).

References

Moths described in 2009
Olethreutini
Moths of Asia
Taxa named by Józef Razowski